SMK Convent may refer to
SMK Convent, Alor Setar
SMK Convent Bukit Nanas
SMK Convent Taiping